Patrick McCartan (13 May 1878 – 28 March 1963) was an Irish republican and politician. He served the First Dáil (1919–1921) on diplomatic missions to the United States and Soviet Russia. He returned to public life in 1948, serving in Seanad Éireann for Clann na Poblachta. McCartan was also a doctor.

Early life
He was born in Eskerbuoy, near Carrickmore, County Tyrone, one of five children, to Bernard McCartan, a farmer, and the former Bridget Rafferty (d. 1918). He emigrated to the USA as a young man and became a member of Clan na Gael in Philadelphia, Pennsylvania and edited the journal Irish Freedom. He returned to Ireland some years later and qualified as a doctor. He also continued working with nationalist politics and worked closely with Bulmer Hobson and Denis McCullough with the Dungannon Clubs and the Irish Republican Brotherhood.

McCartan was to take part in the 1916 Easter Rising with the Tyrone volunteers but did not, owing to Eoin MacNeill's countermanding order. He was arrested after the Rising and interned in an open prison in England.

Elections
In 1917 he took "French leave" to return to Ireland and assist Sinn Féin in the by-elections being held throughout Ireland that year.

McCartan contested the by-election in South Armagh for Sinn Féin but lost out to the Irish Parliamentary Party candidate.  He was later elected in a by-election in Tullamore in 1918. He was re-elected in the 1918 general election.

He was re-elected for Leix–Offaly at the 1921 elections. He gave the Anglo-Irish Treaty his support, albeit reluctantly, in the Dáil debates, saying he would not "vote for chaos." He blamed the whole cabinet for the situation and said that "The Republic of which Mr. de Valera was President is dead." Disillusioned, he quit politics for the next twenty years.

Diplomatic missions (1919–1921)
At the meeting of the First Dáil in January 1919 McCartan was appointed Sinn Féin's representative in the USA where he would remain until 1921. One of his tasks was to secure American recognition before the Paris Peace Conference, 1919, but this proved impossible. While in the USA he renewed his acquaintance with his fellow Carrickmore native Joseph McGarrity. They persuaded Éamon de Valera to support the Philadelphia branch of Clan na Gael against the New York branch led by John Devoy and Judge Daniel Cohalan in their struggle to focus the resources of the Friends of Irish Freedom on Irish independence rather than domestic American politics. McCartan also assisted with the development of the "American Association for the Recognition of the Irish Republic".

McCartan then negotiated with the Soviet Union in 1920–1921 in an attempt to have it recognise the Irish Republic, at a time when both were pariah states. Although Soviet Russia was atheist, he hoped that Ireland could act as "accredited representative of the Republic of Ireland in Russia the interests of the Roman Catholic Church within the territory of the Russian Socialist Federal Soviet Republic. However such efforts failed and diplomatic relations were not established until decades later"

Later political career
He contested the 1945 presidential election as an Independent candidate and secured 20% of the vote. He became a founder member of Clann na Poblachta and contested the 1948 general election without success. As the Minister of External Affairs in the new coalition government, his party leader Seán MacBride put his name forward, with fellow Ulsterman Denis Ireland, to be nominated by the Taoiseach John A. Costello to Seanad Éireann. He served as a Senator until 1951.

In 1932 he published a book, With De Valera in America.

McCartan's daughter, Deirdre, was married to Irish folk musician Ronnie Drew.

McCartan was a supporter of the pro-Axis organisation, Irish Friends of Germany.

References

Sources
 Cronin, Sean, McGarrity Papers (Dublin 1971)
 Gaughan, J.A., Memoirs of Senator Joseph Connolly: A Founder of Modern Ireland (1996)
 The O'Brien Press, Kathleen Clarke: Revolutionary Woman (Cork 1991)

External links
 

1878 births
1963 deaths
Early Sinn Féin TDs
Fianna Fáil politicians
Independent politicians in Ireland
Clann na Poblachta senators
Members of the 1st Dáil
Members of the 2nd Dáil
Members of the 3rd Dáil
Members of the 6th Seanad
Members of the Irish Republican Brotherhood
Members of the Parliament of the United Kingdom for King's County constituencies (1801–1922)
UK MPs 1910–1918
UK MPs 1918–1922
People from County Tyrone
Candidates for President of Ireland
Nominated members of Seanad Éireann